The Inspection is a 2022 American drama film written and directed by Elegance Bratton. Inspired by Bratton's real-life experiences, the film follows a young gay black man who defiantly endures brutal training at a Marines boot camp, seeking approval from his homophobic mother. It stars Jeremy Pope, Raúl Castillo, McCaul Lombardi, Aaron Dominguez, Nicholas Logan, Eman Esfandi, Andrew Kai, Aubrey Joseph, Bokeem Woodbine, and Gabrielle Union.

The film had its world premiere at the 2022 Toronto International Film Festival on September 8, 2022, and was theatrically released in the United States on November 18, 2022, by A24. The film received generally positive reviews from critics, with Pope's performance being praised and earning a Golden Globe nomination.

Synopsis
Ellis French enlists in the Marine Corps and ends up at boot camp on Parris Island, South Carolina. He initially meets the physical requirements, but is not as successful in disguising his sexual orientation, making him the target of a near-lethal hazing from training instructor Leland Laws and a fellow recruit, Laurence Harvey.

Cast
 Jeremy Pope as Ellis French
 Raúl Castillo as Rosales
 Bokeem Woodbine as Leland Laws 
 Gabrielle Union as Inez French
 McCaul Lombardi as Laurence Harvey
 Aaron Dominguez as Castro
 Nicholas Logan as Brooks
 Eman Esfandi as Ismail
 Andrew Kai as Label
 Aubrey Joseph as Boles

Production
In June 2021, it was announced Jeremy Pope, Gabrielle Union, Bokeem Woodbine and Raúl Castillo had joined the cast of the film, with Elegance Bratton directing from a screenplay he wrote, with Gamechanger Films set to produce, and A24 set to produce and distribute. Principal photography concluded by November 2021.

Music
Bratton enlisted Animal Collective to compose and perform a score for the film. The soundtrack album, which features a collaboration with Indigo De Souza titled "Wish I Knew You", was released on November 18.

Release
The film had its world premiere at the 2022 Toronto International Film Festival on September 8, 2022. It also screened at the 60th New York Film Festival on October 14, 2022. It was released in the United States on November 18, 2022.

The film was released for VOD on January 24, 2023, followed by a Blu-ray and DVD release on February 21, 2023.

Reception

Accolades

References

External links
 
 
 
 

2022 directorial debut films
2022 drama films
2022 independent films
2022 LGBT-related films
2020s American films
2020s English-language films
A24 (company) films
American drama films
American independent films
American LGBT-related films
Films about anti-LGBT sentiment
Films about hazing
Films about the United States Marine Corps
Films set in South Carolina
Gay-related films
LGBT-related drama films